George Boardman (born 14 August 1943) is a Scottish former professional footballer who played as an inside forward. Active in both Scotland and England between 1960 and 1973, Boardman made over 350 League appearances, scoring nearly 100 goals.

Playing career
Born in Glasgow, Boardman began his career with Petershill, before playing in the Scottish Football League with Queen's Park, and in the English Football League with Shrewsbury Town and Barnsley. He finished his playing career with spells at St Johnstone and Buxton.

He was also a Scotland Amateur international in 1963.

Later career
After retiring as a player due to injury he became a scout, working for Tottenham Hotspur, Middlesbrough, Hibernian, Bradford City and Swansea City.

Personal life
His father George and son Craig, were also professional footballers.

References

1943 births
Living people
Scottish footballers
Petershill F.C. players
Queen's Park F.C. players
Shrewsbury Town F.C. players
Barnsley F.C. players
St Johnstone F.C. players
Buxton F.C. players
Scottish Football League players
English Football League players
Scotland amateur international footballers
Association football inside forwards
Association football scouts
Tottenham Hotspur F.C. non-playing staff
Middlesbrough F.C. non-playing staff
Hibernian F.C. non-playing staff
Bradford City A.F.C. non-playing staff
Swansea City A.F.C. non-playing staff